José Luis García Pérez (born 21 January 1996), commonly known as Zelu, is a Spanish professional footballer who plays as a winger for CD Badajoz.

Club career
Born in Jerez de la Frontera, Cádiz, Andalusia, Zelu finished his formation with Sevilla FC. On 21 July 2015, he moved to Segunda División B side Marbella FC, and made his senior debut on 29 August of that year by playing the last 15 minutes of a 2–2 away draw against UD Melilla.

Zelu scored his first senior goal on 11 October 2015, netting the opener of a 2–3 loss at UD Almería B. The following 28 January, he moved to Málaga CF and was assigned to the reserves in Tercera División.

Zelu returned to the third tier on 30 December 2016, after agreeing to a deal with San Fernando CD. He moved to fellow league team Melilla on 1 August of the following year, and was a regular starter for the club during the campaign, as his side narrowly missed out the play-offs due to goal average.

In July 2018, Zelu signed for Segunda División side Córdoba CF, but was loaned to Cultural y Deportiva Leonesa on 21 August. Back to the Blanquiverdes for 2019–20, he was assigned to the main squad in the third division before moving out on loan to fellow league team UD Logroñés on 30 January 2020.

Zelu contributed with seven appearances (play-offs included) as Logroñés achieved a first-ever promotion to Segunda División. In July 2020, he signed permanently for UDL, after terminating his contract with Córdoba.

Zelu made his professional debut on 12 September 2020, starting in a 0–1 away loss against Sporting de Gijón.

On 17 August 2021, he joined to Primera División RFEF club Badajoz.

References

External links

1996 births
Living people
Footballers from Jerez de la Frontera
Spanish footballers
Association football forwards
Segunda División players
Segunda División B players
Primera Federación players
Tercera División players
Marbella FC players
Atlético Malagueño players
San Fernando CD players
UD Melilla footballers
Córdoba CF players
Cultural Leonesa footballers
UD Logroñés players
CD Badajoz players